Call waiting is a telecommunication service.

Call waiting may also refer to:

 "Call Waiting" (Prison Break), a 2007 television episode
 "Call Waiting" (Roseanne), a 1996 television episode
 "Call Waiting", a song by Wiz Khalifa from Khalifa, 2016